Hacıuşağı (also, Gadzhi-Ushagy and Gadzhyushagy) is a village and municipality in the Agsu Rayon of Azerbaijan.  It has a population of 435.

References 

Populated places in Agsu District